Slap Software, (Software Livre da Administração Processual, or Free Software of the Procedural Management), is a Brazilian open source system. It was developed to be used in the automation of judicial, administrative and legislative procedures. It is registered in National Industrial Property Institute (INPI). The applications deal with systems with features of research, control, follow-up and the storing of data, including judicial automation, digital procedure, electronic process of law, or protocol.

Purpose 
Slap Software was created mainly to reduce government spending by the reuse of modules in different parts of government.

It was intended to eliminate the institutional waste that comes reimplementing existing functionality. Another purpose was to help improve best practices in the interdisciplinary area between law and information technology.

Concepts 
Modules were tasked with meeting the requirements of multiple applications in judicial, administrative and legislative domains in both civil and criminal),eareas, across jurisdictions, departments and special courts.

Modularization and reuse are fundamental concepts along with object-orientation, component-orientation and data independence.

Modules 
The Slap Software talks about formal elements, such as a case would: example applications, documentations UML and handbooks directed to all the spectrum of its public.

Community 
The software is able to interact with media, with institutions, social networks and other tools.

History 
Slapsoftware was started in January 2008, and continues to evolve. The project was shown in lectures and studied by interested students,  executive and staff members.

See also 
Lawsuit
Virtual world
Audiovisual
Electronic process of law in Brazil

References

Bibliography 
 Almeida Filho, José Carlos Araújo, Processo Eletrônico e Teoria Geral do Processo Eletrônico, Forense, 2007
 Clementino, Edilberto Barbosa, Proceso Judicial Eletrônico em Conformidade com a Lei 11.419, de 19/12/2006, Juruá, 2006
 Larman, Craig. Utilizando UML e Padrões. 3rd Ed. Bookman, 2007. FOWLER, Martin. UML  – Um breve guia para a linguagem padrão de modelagem de objetos. 3rd Ed.
 Bookman, 2005. Blaha, Michael; RUMBAUGH, James. Modelagem e Projetos Baseados em Objetos com UML 2. 1st Ed. Campus, 2006.
 Meilir, Page Jones.  1st Ed. Makron Books, 2001.
 Booch, Grady; Rumbaugh, James; Jacobson, Ivar. UML - Guia do usuário. 2nd Ed. Campus, 2006.
 Block, Joshua. Java Efetivo. 3rd Ed. Alta Books, 2008.
 Deitel, Harvey M.; Deitel, Paul J. Java: Como Programar. 6th Ed. Prentice-Hall, 2005.
 Linden, Peter Van Der. Simplesmente Java 2. 6th Ed. Alta Books, 2005. PRESSMAN, Roger S. Engenharia de Software. 6th Edição. McGraw-Hill, 2006. Sommerville, Ian. Engenharia de Software. 8ª Ed. Pearson Education Do Brasil, 2007.

External links 
 Official site
 Twitter
 Forum
 Talk group
 Source

Free software
Public administration
Legal software companies
Government of Brazil
Government by algorithm